Randell "Randy" Tyree (born 1940) is a Tennessee politician who served as mayor of Knoxville from 1976 to 1983 and was the Democratic candidate for Governor in 1982.

Biography
Tyree was born in Carthage, Tennessee, in 1940. He received a bachelor's degree from Middle Tennessee State University, where his major was political science. Subsequently he earned a law degree from the University of Tennessee. Tyree, now divorced, was married to the former Mary Pat Dukas. The couple has four children.

For a ten-year period early in his career, he worked in law enforcement, including a four-year stint with the Federal Bureau of Investigation (FBI) as well as a period as a police officer in Knoxville. He also served as a police commissioner in the City of Knoxville.

He was elected mayor of Knoxville at age 34 in 1975, the city's youngest candidate ever to hold that office, defeating Republican incumbent Kyle Testerman. He took office the following year. In 1979 he won re-election to a second four-year term, and presided over the city during the 1982 World's Fair.

In 1982 Tyree ran for Governor with support from Jake Butcher. He won the Democratic nomination by defeating Anna Belle Clement O'Brien in the primary election, but lost to Republican incumbent governor Lamar Alexander in the November general election.

Tyree unsuccessfully sought to again become mayor in the 1987 election.

Tyree was a candidate for sheriff of Knox County in 2006 and 2008. In the May 2006 primary he ran as a write-in candidate, winning over 5% of the vote and thus earning a place in the August general election, which he lost to Republican incumbent Tim Hutchison. In 2008 he won the Democratic primary held in February, but lost to J.J. Jones in the August general election.

References

External links
 Randy Tyree's blog

1940 births
Living people
American municipal police chiefs
Federal Bureau of Investigation agents
Mayors of Knoxville, Tennessee
Middle Tennessee State University alumni
Tennessee Democrats
University of Tennessee alumni
People from Carthage, Tennessee